OCP is a video artwork produced and directed by Mitch Stratten. The performance taking place inside an elaborate three tonne moving set allowed a puppeteer to synchronise the space with the unpredictable movement of the three characters contained.

Engineering, construction and testing took place in a North London warehouse over three months preceding the film shoot completed in two days. The score was composed by Mitch Stratten (also known as Nodern) and mastered by Denis Blackham in the Isle of Skye. The ambitious project had a modest budget of GBP 24,000 based on its IMDb entry.

OCP was first released on the Sedition distribution platform curated online. The reception to OCP was positive and polarised with critical reviews from “an imaginative feat”
to “beyond words” and “genius”. OCP has further been included amongst institutional art programmes internationally.  The work integrates ideas on language and folklore. OCP is the abbreviation for orifice conditioning plate, a piece of equipment used in the mining industry that turns the asymmetrical flow of liquid in pipes symmetrical to monitor performance.

References

External links 
OCP on IMDb

British short films
Video art